Govvaafushi as a place name may refer to:
 Govvaafushi (Haa Alif Atoll) (Republic of Maldives)
 Govvaafushi (Lhaviyani Atoll) (Republic of Maldives)